A Generation Ago Today is an album by guitarist Kenny Burrell featuring standards associated with the Benny Goodman Sextet and Charlie Christian recorded in 1966 and 1967 and released on the Verve label.

Reception

Allmusic awarded the album 4 stars with its review by Scott Yanow stating "the now-obscure set has been out-of-print  but the music is excellent".

Track listing 
 "As Long as I Live" (Harold Arlen, Ted Koehler)  
 "Wholly Cats" (Benny Goodman)   
 "A Smooth One" (Goodman)  
 "I Surrender Dear" (Harry Barris, Gordon Clifford)  
 "If I Had You" (Jimmy Campbell, Reg Connelly, Ted Shapiro)   
 "Poor Butterfly" (John Golden, Raymond Hubbell)  
 "Stompin' at the Savoy" (Goodman, Andy Razaf, Edgar Sampson, Chick Webb)  
 "Rose Room" (Art Hickman, Harry Williams)

Personnel 
Kenny Burrell - guitar
Phil Woods - alto saxophone
Mike Mainieri - vibes
Richard Wyands - piano
Ron Carter - bass
Grady Tate - drums

For Charlie Christian and Benny Goodman 
This is an re-issue by Verve with three additional tracks from the same recording sessions.

 "As Long as I Live" (Harold Arlen, Ted Koehler)  
 "Poor Butterfly" (John Golden, Raymond Hubbell)  
 "Stompin' at the Savoy" (Goodman, Andy Razaf, Edgar Sampson, Chick Webb)  
 "I Surrender Dear" (Harry Barris, Gordon Clifford)  
 "Rose Room" (Art Hickman, Harry Williams)
 "If I Had You" (Jimmy Campbell, Reg Connelly, Ted Shapiro)   
 "A Smooth One" (Goodman)  
 "Wholly Cats" (Benny Goodman)   
 Seven Come Eleven
 Moonglow
 Flying Home

References 

Kenny Burrell albums
1967 albums
Verve Records albums
Albums produced by Creed Taylor
Albums recorded at Van Gelder Studio